Vineta, the Sunken City is a 1923 German silent drama film directed by Werner Funck. The title refers to the legendary city of Vineta.

The film's art direction was by Gustav A. Knauer.

Cast
In alphabetical order

References

Bibliography

External links

1923 films
Films of the Weimar Republic
German silent feature films
German black-and-white films
German drama films
1923 drama films
Films directed by Werner Funck
Silent drama films
1920s German films